The 2003 Masters Tournament was the 67th Masters Tournament, held April 11–13 at Augusta National Golf Club in Augusta, Georgia. Mike Weir won his only major title in a one-hole playoff over Len Mattiace. He was the first Canadian to win a major, and also the first left-handed player to win the Masters. He is also the only Canadian to win the tournament.

The start of the first round was delayed until early Friday morning due to successive days of heavy rain; the second round was started on Friday afternoon and completed on Saturday morning.

Field
1. Masters champions
Tommy Aaron, Seve Ballesteros, Charles Coody, Fred Couples, Ben Crenshaw, Nick Faldo (10,11), Raymond Floyd, Bernhard Langer (16,17), Sandy Lyle, Larry Mize, Jack Nicklaus, José María Olazábal (10,14,16), Mark O'Meara (3), Arnold Palmer, Gary Player, Vijay Singh (4,10,14,15,16,17), Craig Stadler, Tom Watson, Tiger Woods (2,3,4,5,12,14,15,16,17), Ian Woosnam, Fuzzy Zoeller
George Archer, Gay Brewer, Jack Burke Jr., Billy Casper, Doug Ford, Bob Goalby, Herman Keiser, and Byron Nelson did not play.

2. U.S. Open champions (last five years)
Retief Goosen (10,14,16,17), Lee Janzen

3. The Open champions (last five years)
David Duval (16,17), Ernie Els (10,14,15,16,17), Paul Lawrie (16)

4. PGA champions (last five years)
Rich Beem (14,16,17), David Toms (14,16,17)

5. The Players Championship winners (last three years)
Davis Love III (14,15,16,17), Craig Perks (14)

6. U.S. Amateur champion and runner-up
Ricky Barnes (a), Hunter Mahan (a)

7. The Amateur champion
Alejandro Larrazábal (a)

8. U.S. Amateur Public Links champion
Ryan Moore (a)

9. U.S. Mid-Amateur champion
George Zahringer (a)

10. Top 16 players and ties from the 2002 Masters
Ángel Cabrera (16,17), Chris DiMarco (14,16,17), Brad Faxon (14,16,17), Sergio García (11,14,16,17), Pádraig Harrington (11,16,17), Miguel Ángel Jiménez, Shigeki Maruyama (14,16,17), Phil Mickelson (11,14,16,17), Colin Montgomerie (16,17), Adam Scott (16,17)

11. Top eight players and ties from the 2002 U.S. Open
Tom Byrum, Scott Hoch (14,15,16,17), Jeff Maggert, Billy Mayfair, Nick Price (14,16,17)

12. Top four players and ties from 2002 PGA Championship
Fred Funk (14,16,17), Justin Leonard (14,15,16,17), Chris Riley (14,16,17)

13. Top four players and ties from the 2002 Open Championship
Stuart Appleby (14,16,17), Steve Elkington, Thomas Levet

14. Top 40 players from the 2002 PGA Tour money list
Robert Allenby (16,17), Jonathan Byrd, K. J. Choi (16,17), John Cook, Bob Estes (16,17), Jim Furyk (15,16,17), Charles Howell III (16,17), Jerry Kelly (16,17), Steve Lowery (16,17), Len Mattiace, Scott McCarron (16,17), Rocco Mediate (16,17), Craig Parry (16,17), Pat Perez, Kenny Perry (16,17), Loren Roberts, John Rollins, Jeff Sluman (16,17), Kevin Sutherland, Phil Tataurangi

15. Top 10 players from the 2003 PGA Tour money list on March 30
Chad Campbell, Jay Haas (17), Mike Weir (16,17)

16. Top 50 players from the final 2002 world ranking
Michael Campbell (17), Darren Clarke (17), Niclas Fasth (17), Toshimitsu Izawa, Shingo Katayama, Peter Lonard (17), Eduardo Romero (17), Justin Rose (17), Toru Taniguchi, Scott Verplank (17)
Thomas Bjørn (17) did not play.

17. Top 50 players from world ranking published March 30
Tim Clark, John Huston, Tom Lehman, Kirk Triplett

18. Special foreign invitation

All the amateurs were playing in their first Masters, as were Rich Beem, Jonathan Byrd, Chad Campbell, K. J. Choi, Thomas Levet, Peter Lonard, Pat Perez, Chris Riley, John Rollins, Justin Rose, and Phil Tataurangi.

Round summaries

First round
Friday, April 11, 2003

With play canceled due to rain on Thursday, the first round started at 7 am Friday with players teeing off at the 1st and 10th holes. The round was dominated by Darren Clarke, who posted a six-under 66. The score was even more impressive considering only seven shot under par for the round. Sergio García shot 69 (−3), in a second place tie with 2002 U.S. Amateur champion Ricky Barnes. Three-time major champion, Nick Price, shot 70 (−2), for a fourth place tie with Canadian Mike Weir. Two-time defending champ and three-time Masters champion, Tiger Woods shot a disappointing 76 (+4), ten strokes back.

Second round
Friday, April 11, 2003
Saturday, April 12, 2003

Due to the postponement of play on Thursday, the second round started at 2 pm on Friday with players starting at the 1st and 10th tees. In what proved to be another very difficult round at Augusta, Weir took a four stroke 36-hole lead with a four-under 68 for 138 (−6). Only 16 of the 93 competitors finished with a round below par, and only four were under par at the halfway mark. First round leader Clarke came back to earth with 76 (+4) for solo second at 142 (−2). Phil Mickelson charged up the leaderboard with a two-under 70 into a tie for third place with amateur Barnes. (Two other amateurs also made the cut, Hunter Mahan and Ryan Moore.) Five were tied for fifth place at even-par 144, including two former Masters champions in Vijay Singh and José María Olazábal. The round was completed on Saturday morning and the 36-hole cut was set at 149 (+5). The biggest name to fail to make the weekend was Colin Montgomerie.

Amateurs: Barnes (-1), Mahan (+1), Moore (+3), Larrázabal (+19), Zahringer (+23).

Third round
Saturday, April 12, 2003

Following the completion of the second round on Saturday morning, "Moving day" lived up to its name in the third round as Jeff Maggert charged to the 54-hole lead with a six-under 66 for 211 (−5). Second round leader Weir shot 75 (+3) to fall back to 213 (−3), in solo second place and the final Sunday pairing with Maggert. Singh moved into a tie for third with another major champion in David Toms at 214 (−2). Woods matched the round of the day with a 66 (−6) to ascend the leaderboard to keep his bid for three-straight Masters alive. Mickelson and Olazábal were tied with Woods at 215 for fifth place. Len Mattiace shot 69 (−3) to get to even-par 216, five strokes back in a tie for eighth. The third round was completed late on Saturday, and the tournament was finally back on schedule. 

Source:

Final round
Sunday, April 13, 2003

Summary
Despite one of the largest major championship final round comebacks by Mattiace, Mike Weir bested him in a sudden death playoff for his first major title. Weir became the first Canadian ever to win a major championship, and also became the first left-handed player to win the Masters. The sudden death playoff at the par 4 10th was the only extra hole needed, as Weir's bogey was good enough as Mattiace double-bogeyed the hole. Weir recovered from his disappointing third round with his second 68 of the tournament to force the playoff. To get into the sudden death playoff, Weir made a  putt for par on the 18th green.  Mattiace's only bogey (besides the playoff hole) of his tournament-low 65 (−7) was at the 18th hole. He teed off forty minutes and four groups ahead of the final pairing, so Mattiace had about an hour between the completion of his round and the start of the playoff.

Third round leader Maggert shot a disappointing 75 (+3) to finish in solo fifth place. Maggert had no bogeys or double bogeys, but made a triple bogey 7 on the third hole and a quintuple bogey 8 on the twelfth hole. Mickelson's 68 (−4) was only enough for solo third, two strokes behind Weir and Mattiace. It marked Mickelson's third straight third-place finish at the Masters (he would win the green jacket in 2004, 2006, and 2010). Jim Furyk also shot a four-under 68 for a fourth-place finish which equaled his best Masters finish at 284 (−4). (He would win the next major, at the U.S. Open in June.) Ernie Els and Singh rounded out the under par finishers at 287 (−1), in a tie for sixth. Toms shot 74 and fell back to even-par 288, in a five-way tie for eighth. Woods' bid for his third straight Masters victory came up well short with a disappointing 75 (+3) for 290 (+2), nine strokes back. Amateur Barnes was the low-amateur, after being near the top of the leaderboard the first two rounds.

This was the last year the sudden-death playoff began on the 10th tee. Beginning in 2004, the playoff starting point was changed to the 18th hole, which then alternated with the 10th hole until a winner emerged; the first use was in 2005.

Final leaderboard

Scorecard

Cumulative tournament scores, relative to par
{|class="wikitable" span = 50 style="font-size:85%;
|-
|style="background: Red;" width=10|
|Eagle
|style="background: Pink;" width=10|
|Birdie
|style="background: PaleGreen;" width=10|
|Bogey
|style="background: Green;" width=10|
|Double bogey
|style="background: Olive;" width=10|
|Triple bogey+
|}
Source:

Playoff

Sudden-death playoff began and ended on par-4 10th hole; Weir's bogey defeated Mattiace.

References

External links
Masters.com – past winners and results
Coverage on the European Tour's official site
Augusta.com – 2003 Masters leaderboard and scorecards

2003
2003 in golf
2003 in American sports
2003 in sports in Georgia (U.S. state)
April 2003 sports events in the United States